Franco-Seychellois are people of French descent living in the Seychelles. Franco-Seychellois have played an important role in the country's history both before and since independence.

Origins
Many Franco-Seychellois settled on the islands during the period of French rule over the archipelago. During this time, African and Malagasy slaves were also brought to the Seychelles. Franco-Seychellois were allowed to retain their culture after the British took control of the Seychelles.

History
Historically, French-speaking European Seychellois were divided between two classes, grands blancs, who represented the wealthy planter class, and petit blancs, who represented the working classes. The grands blancs are a less numerous group, composed of only about forty large families, but held most of the land and political power in the islands in the colonial era. The Planters and Taxpayers Association, which represented the interests of the grands blancs, dominated the Legislative Council of Seychelles from its inception in 1962. The two groups were historically divided, and as a consequence the petit blancs were politically aligned with the Seychellois Creole people by the 1960s. Upon the independence of Seychelles, many Franco-Seychellois played important roles in the development of a one-party socialist state under the leadership of France-Albert René (himself ethnically French) and the Seychelles People's United Party.

Modern history
Franco-Seychellois play an important role in the country's economy. They are employed in all sectors, including government, business and education.

Language and religion
The majority of Franco-Seychellois speak Seychellois Creole, the country's most widely spoken language. They also often speak French and English. Of the religiously affiliated, the large majority are Roman Catholic, with a minority belonging to other Christian denominations.

Notable people

James Alix Michel - President of Seychelles
Alain St Ange - Minister of Tourism and Culture
Jean-François Ferrari - Minister of Fisheries
Gérard Hoarau - opposition leader in the Seychelles as head of the Seychelles National Movement, assassinated in 1985 in London.
James Mancham -  the first President of Seychelles from 1976 to 1977.
Jean-Paul Adam - Minister of Foreign Affairs
Mathilda Twomey -  lawyer and former Chief Justice
Bernard Georges - Member of the National Assembly

References

External links

Ethnic groups in Seychelles
Seychelles